Adelaide Hills Council is a local government area in the Adelaide Hills of South Australia. It is in the hills east of Adelaide, the capital of South Australia, and extends from the South Para Reservoir in the north to the Mount Bold Reservoir in the south.

The council was established in 1997 by the amalgamation of the District Council of East Torrens, the District Council of Gumeracha, the District Council of Onkaparinga and the District Council of Stirling.

Council
The current council  is:

Suburbs

The Adelaide Hills Council contains the following suburbs and localities:

References

External links
Adelaide Hills Council website
Adelaide Hills Council community profile

Local government areas in Adelaide
Local government areas of South Australia